Eleanore Griffin (April 29, 1904 – July 26, 1995) was an American screenwriter who worked in Hollywood. She is best known for co-writing the film Boys Town, which she won an Oscar for in 1938. Griffin worked on and wrote for over 20 different Hollywood films between 1937 and 1964.

Personal life 
Griffin was born in St. Paul, Minnesota, in 1904, the daughter of Patrick Griffin (and Irish immigrant) and Nellie Shine.

While in Hollywood, Griffin struggled at times with alcoholism, which resulted in a break from her work from 1948 until 1955.

Griffin was romantically involved with fellow studio writer William Rankin. The two were meant to be wed in 1937 in Tijuana, Mexico, but because of technicalities in Mexican law were never officially married. This fact was revealed to them when they sought out a divorce the following year in 1938. The two continued a professional relationship, working together on six different scripts.

Griffin died at the age of 91 at the Motion Picture and Television Fund Hospital in Woodland Hills, California.

Career 
Griffin got into writing as a journalist in the 1920s. She started in Hollywood at the age of 33 when she began writing for different studios and wrote the story for the film Time out for Romance (1937). Her first job in Hollywood was working at Universal writing short stories, or treatments, which if accepted would later be turned into a screenplay.

After her start in 1937, Griffin would go on to write for more than 30 years in Hollywood. In those 30 years, she worked for a number of different studios, such as MGM, Disney, Fox, and Paramount. Her screenplays and stories were the basis for many famous directors of the time, such as Douglas Sirk and George Sidney.

In 1938, Griffin won her first and only Oscar for co-writing the story for the film Boys Town. The film, directed by Norman Taurog, is based on the real-life priest Father Edward J. Flanagan, who tried to help a group of underprivileged boys through a home that he founded called Boys Town. In 1994, Newt Gingrich, speaker of the House of Representatives, referenced the film to argue that philanthropists would help people who were affected by government cuts.

Several films written by Griffin deal with characters who are religious figures. This includes her Oscar-winning film Boys Town, with the character of Father Flanagan, as well as A Man Called Peter, with the character of Peter Marshall, a Presbyterian minister, and Reverend Norman Vincent Peale in One Man’s Way.

Filmography

Films

Television

References

External links 
 

1904 births
1995 deaths
Writers from Saint Paul, Minnesota
American women screenwriters
Screenwriters from Minnesota
20th-century American women writers
20th-century American screenwriters